Restrepia chameleon, the color-changing restrepia, is a species of orchid endemic to Colombia.

References

External links 

chameleon
Endemic orchids of Colombia
Plants described in 1996